Human Rights was an abolitionist journal founded by Lewis Tappan. The journal was first published in July 1835. The last issue appeared in February 1839. It was published monthly by the American Anti Slavery Society.

References

American Anti-Slavery Society
Monthly magazines published in the United States
Defunct political magazines published in the United States
Magazines established in 1835
Magazines disestablished in 1839